Crash Bandicoot Purple: Ripto's Rampage and Spyro Orange: The Cortex Conspiracy are two platform games published by Vivendi Universal Games.  They are developed by Vicarious Visions for the Game Boy Advance. They were released in North America on June 3, 2004, and in Europe on June 25, 2004 under the names Crash Bandicoot Fusion and Spyro Fusion.

The games are the tenth installment in the Crash Bandicoot series of video games, and the eighth installment in the Spyro series of video games. For both series, the games are the fourth installments made for the Game Boy Advance. This crossover is set after the events of their games for that platform. The story of the games center on a plot to wreak havoc on the universe by the main antagonists Doctor Neo Cortex and Ripto, who have recently joined forces. The protagonists of the story, Crash Bandicoot and Spyro the Dragon, must team up and defeat Doctor Cortex and Ripto along with their genetically modified minions. This game marks Brendan O'Brien's last appearance in the series as the voice of Crash.

Gameplay
Ripto's Rampage and The Cortex Conspiracy are single-player side-scrolling crossover adventure games in which the player controls Crash Bandicoot and/or Spyro the Dragon in the respective games. While the games feature platforming elements that allow Crash and Spyro to navigate different areas, the main focus is on a series of minigames that make up the core of the gameplay. The minigames involve distinctively different gameplay elements, such as destroying enemies in a Breakout-inspired challenge or racing through an area with a jet pack, tank or inner tube. The games make use of the Game Link Cable, allowing players to compete in multiplayer versions of several of the minigames found in the games. Much of these minigames only require one copy of either of the games for as many as four players in the network. Players can earn trading cards by performing specific tasks; these cards can be traded between Game Boy Advance systems to players who do not physically own a copy of the games. Additional content can be accessed if the two games are linked to each other.

Plot
Doctor Neo Cortex and Ripto join forces to rid themselves of their respective adversaries Crash Bandicoot and Spyro the Dragon by genetically modifying Ripto's "Riptoc" minions and disguising them as Crash and Spyro, leading the two protagonists to believe they are against each other. Crash and Spyro are alerted of their respective worlds' predicament and are sent to get rid of the disguised Riptocs. Crash and Spyro eventually encounter each other between Wumpa Jungle and Dragon Castles, believing each other to be a disguised Riptoc. However, they soon discover that they have been tricked into fighting each other by Cortex and Ripto and decide to team up against them.

Spyro and Crash's recent success leads to an argument between Cortex and Ripto so they decide to send Cortex's niece, Nina Cortex, to Fire Mountain where she kidnaps Coco and the Professor. Blink the Mole informs Crash and Spyro of the kidnapping. When the duo confronted Nina, Crash distracts Nina having her chase him so Spyro can free Coco and the Professor unnoticed. This worked as Coco and the Professor are free while Nina is trapped in a cage. The Professor is disappointed as their work to track down Cortex and Ripto is destroyed so Coco hatches an idea: If Crash and Spyro can put a tracer on Cortex and Ripto, they would track them to their headquarters so the duo splits up and go to each other's home world this way their respective nemesis won't suspect anything. Only Spyro succeeds in planting a tracer on Cortex. Crash and Spyro reach their headquarters in outer space called Tech Park. As a team, Crash and Spyro defeat Cortex and Ripto once and for all.

Development
As production finished on Crash Nitro Kart, Vivendi Universal Games contemplated the next handheld game in the Crash Bandicoot series. Hoping to do something different from what has been done before, Vivendi Universal Games approached Vicarious Visions with the concept of bringing Crash Bandicoot and Spyro the Dragon together for the first time. Liking the idea, Vicarious Visions collaborated with Vivendi Universal Games in filling out the concept to what would become the two games.

The game was designed by Jonathan Russell and Colin Wilkinson. The game was programmed by Sunbir Gill, Jan-Erik Steel and Eric Caraszi. Brent Gibson, Chongguang Zhang, Robyn Poirier and Jason Harlow served as the game's artists, while Harlow, Travis Cameron, Kaan Kayimoglu and Rob Gallerani provided the game's animation. The game's audio was provided by Shin'en Multimedia.

Reception

Ripto's Rampage received mostly positive reviews from critics upon its release. Frank Provo of GameSpot credited the game as "a good, solid choice for fans of the genre", citing its strong minigames and well-made platforming mechanics. Craig Harris of IGN found that the game "offers a lot of challenge and variety with a ton of single and multiplayer mini-games", but described the overall design of the game as "loosely constructed with a comparatively wimpy, underdeveloped overworld design". Tom Bramwell of Eurogamer criticized the minigames and warned experienced gamers that the collection would "quickly become far too familiar and untaxing to warrant extended interest." Nintendo Power said that the game "presents a steady stream of minigames with tons of variety". Play Magazine considered the game superior to its "crossover cousin" The Cortex Conspiracy, but decided that the game "still feels cheap". David Chapman of GameSpy praised the library of minigames and the extras unlocked when the game is linked with a copy of The Cortex Conspiracy, while Lisa Mason of Game Informer criticized the platforming levels as "derivative and uninspired" and the minigames as "frustrating and not very much fun at all". Louis Bedigian of GameZone noted the plentiful minigames, but found the game to be lacking in adventuring, platforming or excitement.

The Cortex Conspiracy was generally rated lower than Ripto's Rampage by critics. David Chapman of GameSpy said that the game "has plenty to keep most gamers entertained for hours", and noted that the connectivity options with Ripto's Rampage resulted in a "surefire formula for success". Nintendo Power concluded that the graphics and gameplay were "a step up from those of Spyro's isometric-view adventures". Anise Hollingshead of GameZone concluded that The Cortex Conspiracy is "an average game that will give a decent amount of gameplay value, but just doesn't offer much in the way of excitement or thinking", and went on to say that "having lots of mini-games is a good idea, but the games themselves needed to be more varied and not just be various versions of racing games and breakout clones". Frank Provo of GameSpot decided that "on its own, there really isn't enough to Spyro Orange to keep players interested for very long". Lisa Mason of Game Informer dismissed the game as "just a mishmash of concepts that never really gel into anything great". Tom Bramwell of Eurogamer criticized the minigames and warned experienced gamers that the collection would "quickly become far too familiar and untaxing to warrant extended interest".

References

External links
 
 

2004 video games
Crash Bandicoot games
Crossover video games
Game Boy Advance games
Game Boy Advance-only games
Sierra Entertainment games
S
Universal Interactive games
Vicarious Visions games
Multiplayer and single-player video games
Video games developed in the United States